The 2021 Braga Open was a professional tennis tournament played on clay courts. It was the third edition of the tournament which was part of the 2021 ATP Challenger Tour. It took place in Braga, Portugal between 20 and 26 September 2021.

Singles main-draw entrants

Seeds

 1 Rankings are as of 13 September 2021.

Other entrants
The following players received wildcards into the singles main draw:
  Pedro Araújo
  Tiago Cação
  Luís Faria

The following players received entry into the singles main draw using protected rankings:
  Filippo Baldi
  Joris De Loore

The following players received entry from the qualifying draw:
  Peter Heller
  Santiago Rodríguez Taverna
  Nikolás Sánchez Izquierdo
  Kaichi Uchida

The following player received entry as a lucky loser:
 Alex Rybakov

Champions

Singles
 
  Thiago Monteiro def.  Nikola Milojević 7–5, 7–5.

Doubles

 Nuno Borges /  Francisco Cabral def.  Jesper de Jong /  Bart Stevens 6–3, 6–7(4–7), [10–5].

References

2021 ATP Challenger Tour
2021 in Portuguese tennis
September 2021 sports events in Portugal